Aemilius Ludwig Richter (15 February 1808 – 8 May 1864, in Berlin) was a German jurist.

Biography
He was born at Stolpen, Saxony, and educated at Leipzig. His Corpus Juris Canonici (1833–39) led to his being appointed professor of law in Leipzig, and he held subsequently similar positions at the universities of Marburg (1838–46) and Berlin (1846–64). He also served as councilor-in-chief of the consistory and privy councilor of the government.

Richter is considered the founder of a new school of church law — the so-called “Berliner Kanonisten-Schule”.

Works
 Beiträge zur Kenntnis der Quellen des canonischen Rechts (“Contributions to the knowledge about sources for canon law”, 1834)
 Canones et Decreta Concilio Tridentini (1853)
 Lehrbuch des katholischen und evangelischen Kirchenrechts (“Textbook of Catholic and Evangelical Church law”, 1842, 8th edition 1886) Considered a most important contribution to Church law literature.

References
 

1808 births
1864 deaths
Jurists from Saxony
Leipzig University alumni
Academic staff of Leipzig University
Academic staff of the University of Marburg
Academic staff of the Humboldt University of Berlin